Anda Pinkerfeld Amir (June 26, 1902 – March 27, 1981) was an Israeli poet and writer. She is best remembered in Israel as a children's writer.

Biography

Anda Pinkerfeld was born in Rzeszow, Poland in 1902. Her father worked as an architect for the Austro-Hungarian government. Her family was secular, and did not provide a Jewish education. After the Lwów pogrom (1918), she became involved with the Hashomer Hatzair movement and switched schools to the Jewish gymnasia in Lvov. In 1920 she left for Mandate Palestine with a Hashomer Hatzair group, but later returned to Lvov, for her BA.

During this time, she married Arieh Krampner-Amir, an agriculturalist. In 1924, the couple returned to Palestine. After living in Kibbutz Bet Alfa and Tel Aviv, they eventually settled in Kiryat Anavim and had a daughter, Zippor and a son, Amos.

In the aftermath of World War II, Pinkerfeld-Amir was sent to work in the Displaced Persons camps in Germany by the Jewish Agency. Pinkerfeld-Amir kept a diary of her experiences in Europe. She later worked in the archives of the Ministry of Defense, keeping records of soldiers who fell in the 1948 War of Independence.

Pinkerfeld-Amir died March 27, 1981.

Work 

In her youth, Pinkerfeld-Amir wrote and published poetry in Polish. After immigrating to Palestine, she was influenced by Uri Zvi Greenberg and began writing in Hebrew. Her earliest work in Hebrew was published in 1928 under the pen name Bat-Hedva, meaning daughter of Hedva, her mother's Hebrew name.

She wrote many portrayals of biblical characters, but after her experiences in the camps in Germany, her work took on a more nationalistic tone. She was among the first writers to deal with the holocaust, when most writers avoided the subject.
 
Her most remembered work was written for children; in rhyme and lyrics, and more serious writing helping children deal with loss.

Awards and honors
 In 1936, she received the Bialik Institute prize for her book of Children's poems.
 In 1971, she was awarded the Hayim Greenberg Prize for her poetry.
 In 1978, she received the Israel prize, for children's literature.

Publications

In Polish 

 Song of Life, 1921

In Hebrew 

 Whispering Days, 1929
 Al Anan Kevish, 1933
 Children's Poems, 1934
 Geisha Lian Tang Sharah, 1935
 Gittit, 1937
 From Time Immemorial: Ancient Figures, 1942
 Haruzim Alizim, 1944
 Duda'im ("Mandrakes"), 1945
 Gadish ("Grain Heap"): Poems, 1949
 Ahat: Poema, 1952
 Stars in the Bucket, 1957
 Shalom, Yeladim, 1965
 A Secret with My Older Brother
 Tehiyyot, 1976
 U-vekhol Zot, 1980

References 

Israel Prize women recipients
Israel Prize in children's literature recipients
Israeli children's writers
Polish emigrants to Mandatory Palestine
20th-century Israeli Jews
1902 births
1981 deaths
Israeli women children's writers
Israeli women poets
20th-century women writers
20th-century Israeli poets